"Where Were You in the Morning?" is a song by Canadian singer Shawn Mendes. Written by Geoff Warburton, Scott Harris and its producers Teddy Geiger and Mendes, it was released by Island Records on May 18, 2018, as the fourth single from Mendes' self-titled third studio album.

Release
Mendes first teased the song on May 16, 2018, by posting its artwork and release date on social media. On May 17, 2018, the Canadian singer first premiered it live alongside John Mayer during Apple Music's One Night Only event. On December 21, 2018, Mendes released a version of the song remixed by Kaytranada.

Composition
"Where Were You in the Morning?" is a hybrid of pop and R&B with an "atmospheric" production, featuring a "bluesy, soulful guitar" and handclaps. It also resembles Mendes's idol John Mayer's work. According to Billboards Lars Brandle, the song is "Mendes' melancholy tale of a one-night stand who bailed on him the next morning without so much as a good-bye".

Personnel
Credits adapted from Tidal.
 Shawn Mendes – production, vocals, background vocals, guitar
 Teddy Geiger – production, keyboard, background vocals, guitar, programming
 Harry Burr – mixing assistance
 Nate Mercereau – bass, guitar
 Scott Harris – guitar
 Andrew Maury – mixing

Charts

Certifications

References

External links
 

2010s ballads
2018 songs
2018 singles
Island Records singles
Shawn Mendes songs
Songs written by Geoff Warburton
Songs written by Scott Harris (songwriter)
Songs written by Shawn Mendes
Songs written by Teddy Geiger